Pimentelia is a genus of flowering plants belonging to the family Rubiaceae.

Its native range is Peru.

Species:
 Pimentelia glomerata Wedd.

References

Rubiaceae
Rubiaceae genera